"Come Spy With Me" (T54145) was a 1967 song recorded by Motown Records R&B group The Miracles, released on its Tamla Records subsidiary label. The B-side of the group's Top 20 hit single "The Love I Saw in You Was Just a Mirage", It was written by Miracles lead singer Smokey Robinson, and was the original titular theme song from the 1967 20th Century Fox feature film of the same name, starring Troy Donahue and Andrea Dromm.

This song, recorded by the group in June 1966, was released the following year and was a regional hit, though not charting nationally, and did not appear on any original Miracles studio album, but since its original release, has been included in The Miracles' 1994 35th Anniversary box set collection.

Personnel
The Miracles
Smokey Robinson - Lead vocals
Claudette Robinson - Soprano vocals
Bobby Rogers - Tenor vocals
Ronnie White - Baritone vocals
Pete Moore - Bass vocals
Marv Tarplin - Guitar

References

External links
 Song Review-from the "Wires and Waves" website
 Come Spy With Me and Lyrics on You Tube website

Songs about spies
Tamla Records singles
1967 songs
The Miracles songs
Songs written by Smokey Robinson
Songs written for films